Hyundai Motor Company has produced the following families of automobile engines. Gasoline engines use a naming system based on Greek letters.

 Spark Ignition (Gasoline)
 Straight-3
 Epsilon ε - 0.8 L
 Kappa κ - 1.0 L
 Straight-4
 Epsilon ε - 1.0/1.1 L
 Kappa κ - 1.2/1.25/1.4/1.6 L
 Alpha α - 1.3/1.4/1.5/1.6 L
 Gamma γ - 1.4/1.6 L
 Sirius - 1.5/1.6/1.8/2.0/2.4 L
 Beta β - 1.6/1.8/2.0 L
 Nu ν - 1.8/2.0 L
 Theta θ - 1.8/2.0/2.4 L
 V6
 Delta Δ - 2.0/2.5/2.7 L
 Mu μ - 2.7 L
 Sigma Σ - 3.0/3.5 L
 Lambda Λ - 3.0/3.3/3.5/3.8 L
 V8
 Omega Ω - 4.5 L
 Tau τ - 4.6/5.0 L

 Compression Ignition (Diesel)
Straight-3
U - 1.1/1.2 L
D4B- 1.5 L
D - 1.5 L
 Straight-4
U - 1.4/1.5/1.6/1.7 L
D - 2.0/2.2 L
D4B- 2.0/2.2 L
R - 2.0/2.2 L
A - 2.5 L
J- 2.9 L
G- 4.0 L
 I6
G4B 5.9 L
H- 10 L
Powertech 12 L
KK/KK- 6.6 L
GG-BK- 11 L
 V6
 S - 3.0 L 
 V8
D8A - 16/18 L

See also
List of Hyundai transmissions
List of Hyundai vehicles
Hyundai
ICE

Hyundai